The Rural Municipality of Mervin No. 499 is a rural municipality (RM) in the Canadian province of Saskatchewan within Census Division No. 17 and  Division No. 6.

History 
The RM of Mervin No. 499 incorporated as a rural municipality on January 1, 1913. It absorbed the RM of Greenfield No. 529. The RM of Greenfield No. 529 was originally named the RM of Bright Sand No. 529 prior to February 2, 1926.

Geography

Communities and localities 
The following urban municipalities are surrounded by the RM.

Towns
 Turtleford

Villages
 Mervin

Resort villages
 Kivimaa-Moonlight Bay

The following unincorporated communities are within the RM.

Organized hamlets
 Crystal Bay-Sunset
 Evergreen Acres
 Evergreen Beach
 Horseshoe Bay
 Kopp's Kove
 Livelong
 Mowrey Beach
 Parkland Beach
 Powm Beach
 Spruce Lake
 Sunset View Beach, restructured from resort village status, January 1, 2005
 Turtle Lake South Bay

Localities
 Aspen Cove
 Cleeves
 Cuffley
 Daysville
 Diamond Willows
 Eastview Beach
 Elmhurst
 Sandy Point
 Stowlea
 Thunderchild
 Turtle Cove

Demographics 

Government 
The RM of Mervin No. 499 is governed by an elected municipal council and an appointed administrator that meets on the second and fourth Tuesday of every month. The reeve of the RM is Gerry Ritz while its administrator is L. Ryan Domotor. The RM's office is located in Turtleford.

Attractions 
 Turtle Lake
Turtle Lake Provincial Recreation Site
 Bright Sand Lake
Bright Sand Lake Regional Park

Transportation 
 Saskatchewan Highway 3
 Saskatchewan Highway 26
 Saskatchewan Highway 303
 Saskatchewan Highway 794
 Saskatchewan Highway 795
 Saskatchewan Highway 796

See also 
List of rural municipalities in Saskatchewan

References

External links 

M

Division No. 17, Saskatchewan